Blackbox is the first novel by British writer Nick Walker.

Plot
A stowaway dies on board a flight.

Major themes
A major theme of the book is six degrees of separation, the theory that people are linked by a surprisingly small number of connections.

Style
The book is written as a countdown of 840 chapters, some as short as a few words. The author creates an atmosphere which has been compared to those in novels by Chris Morris and J. G. Ballard.

Reception
The book was longlisted for the British Book Award and the Whitbread First Novel Award.

References

2002 British novels
Headline Publishing Group books